Alan Lane is an Australian former tennis player who competed on the world tour from 1959 to 1964.

Lane, who grew up in Adelaide, made the singles fourth round of the 1963 French Championships and won several international tournaments. These titles include Israel's Passover championships and the Chilean championships in Santiago. He served as the coach of both Portugal and Israel in the Davis Cup. During the 1970s he relocated to the United States and worked as a teaching pro, but is now living in Far North Queensland.

References

External links
 
 

Year of birth missing (living people)
Living people
Australian male tennis players
Tennis players from Adelaide